Flensburg University of Applied Sciences (German Hochschule Flensburg) is a vocational university of higher education and applied research located in the city of Flensburg in the Federal State of Schleswig-Holstein.

Education

Originally established as Königliche Seedampf-Maschinistenschule (Royal School for Naval Steam Machinists) the university was founded in 1886. Until 1975 the FUAS mainly educated marine engineers and officers. The expansion of the study program over the past 30 years has added all major engineering and information technology disciplines and a school for business administration.

Today, the FUAS has a strong emphasis on nautical engineering, communication technology, biotechnology and renewable energy engineering. This focus is supported by the state of Schleswig-Holstein which is one of the leading European regions in applying renewable energy and environmental technologies, covering about one third of its electricity consumption mainly by wind energy and biogas.

Faculties
 
There are four faculties (Fachbereiche) offering undergraduate and graduate degree programs:

 Faculty of Mechanical Engineering, Process Engineering and Maritime Technologies
 Faculty of Energy and Biotechnology
 Faculty of Information and Communication
 School of Business

Flensburg Campus 

Merged with the FHF the University of Flensburg (Universität Flensburg) is also sited on the Campus. The infrastructure includes the Auditorium Maximum (called Audimax) lecture hall, the central library, a wide park area, student residences, a kindergarten, a sports and fitness center and the canteen (Mensa), also several small cafeterias and a student's pub. In early 2010, the construction for a water sports center and a campus chapel were completed, in 2011 the "Maritime Center" was completed. The main railway station is about one mile from the campus, the beach at about 5 miles.

International

Several bi-national study programs are established together with the nearby University of Sønderborg, Denmark and other European partner universities within the ERASMUS programme. Partner Universities in the UK are e.g. the John Moores University in Liverpool and the University of Surrey. 
Oversea partners are the University of North Carolina, the North-West University in Vanderbijlpark, South Africa and the Polytechnic of Namibia in Windhoek.

External links 

 official website (German)

Buildings and structures in Flensburg
Universities of Applied Sciences in Germany
Public universities and colleges in Germany
Educational institutions established in 1886
Universities and colleges in Schleswig-Holstein
1886 establishments in Germany